Tomahawk is a 1951 American Western film directed by George Sherman and starring Van Heflin and Yvonne De Carlo. The film is loosely based on events that took place in Wyoming in 1866 to 1868 around Fort Phil Kearny on the Bozeman Trail such as the Fetterman Fight and Wagon Box Fight. In the UK, the film was released as The Battle of Powder River.

It is one of the first films to empathise with the views of the native Americans.

Plot

The story has two main threads: the white fur traders, and their relatively friendly relationship with the Sioux; and the US Cavalry who have a very distanced relationship with the Sioux. The traders and scouts are led by Jim Bridger who has the Indian name of "Tomahawk".

A small travelling show run by Julie Madden gets an escort cross-country to a fort from Lt Dancy. En route Dancy kills a young unarmed Sioux boy without provocation, for being near his horses. He tells his corporal to explain the night-time shot as him killing a fox. In retaliation on the following day, half a dozen mounted Sioux ambush the travelling show hitting Julie's elderly companion Dan with an arrow in the chest. They take the injured man to the fort but the doctor refuses to operate. Julie persuades Jim Bridger to operate and Bridger saves his life. Jim asks Julie to look after Monahseetah his female Cheyenne travelling companion, the daughter of Chief Black Kettle .

The Sioux approach the fort in small groups and pick off one sentry at a time then ride off. Julie has taken a horse out without permission and they chase her. Jim calls them off, but one still chases her. Jim pulls him from his horse and they fight. It is Red Cloud's favourite son and he is killed. When they get back to the fort they can hear the Sioux war drums.

Bridger discovers that Dancy killed his Cheyenne wife, Monahseetah's sister, after Dancy leads a suicidal attack on a group of Sioux where he is the sole survivor.

The Sioux attack the fort in waves but the newly arrived breach loading rifles defeat them.

Cast
 Van Heflin as Jim Bridger  
 Yvonne De Carlo as Julie Madden
 Alex Nicol as 1st. Lt. Rob Dancy
 Preston Foster as Col. Carrington
 Rock Hudson as Cpl. Burt Hanna
 Arthur Space as Capt. William J. Fetterman
 Russ Conway as Maj. Horton (as Russell Conway)
 Stuart Randall as Sgt. Newell
 Jack Oakie as Sol Beckworth (based on James Beckwourth)
 Tom Tully as Dan Castello 
 John War Eagle as Red Cloud
 Susan Cabot as Monahseetah
 Ann Doran as Mrs. Carrington

Production
The film was based on a story by Daniel Jarrett. Film rights were bought by Universal in 1947; they assigned Leonard Goldstein to produce and George Sherman to direct. In August 1948 Universal announced the film would be one of their Technicolor productions for the following year, along with Calamity Jane and Sam Bass, Sierra, Streets of Cairo, Bloomer Girl and Bagdad.

In May 1949 Stephen McNally was announced for the lead and Edna Anhalt was going to write the script. McNally dropped out and was replaced by Van Heflin in March 1950 and Anhalt is not credited on the final film. In April Yvonne De Carlo was cast opposite Heflin. De Carlo liked that her part was more of a straight dramatic role.

Shooting began in May 1950. The film was shot partly on location in South Dakota.

Reception
The Los Angeles Times called it a "well made, exciting movie."

In June 1952 Van Heflin and George Sherman were reported as working on a followup to the movie.

References

External links

 
 
 

1951 films
1951 Western (genre) films
American Western (genre) films
Films directed by George Sherman
Films scored by Hans J. Salter
Films set in the 1860s
Universal Pictures films
Western (genre) films based on actual events
1950s English-language films
1950s American films